Bursera stenophylla is a Mexican species of trees in the frankincense family in the soapwood order. It has been found in the States of Sonora, Chihuahua, and Sinaloa in northwestern Mexico.

Bursera stenophylla is a small tree. Leaves are bipinnately compound, up to 13 cm (5.2 inches) long.

References

stenophylla
Flora of Northwestern Mexico
Plants described in 1923